List of cross-platform multi-threading libraries  for the C++ programming language.

 Rogue Wave SourcePro Threads Module
 Boost.Thread
 C++ Standard Library Thread
 Dlib
 OpenMP
 OpenThreads
 Parallel Patterns Library
 POCO C++ Libraries Threading
 POSIX Threads
 Qt QThread
 Stapl
 TBB
IPP
 HPX
Concurrencpp
https://github.com/taskflow/taskflow

C++ libraries
C++ Multi-threading libraries
Multi-threading libraries